Gelastocoris oculatus, the big-eyed toad bug, is a species of toad bug in the family Gelastocoridae. It is found in Central America and North America.

Subspecies
These two subspecies belong to the species Gelastocoris oculatus:
 Gelastocoris oculatus oculatus (Fabricius, 1798)
 Gelastocoris oculatus variegatus (Guérin-Méneville, 1844)

References

Further reading

External links

 

Articles created by Qbugbot
Insects described in 1798
Gelastocoridae